V. Peter Harder  (born August 25, 1952) is a Canadian former senior civil servant who was named to the Senate of Canada to represent Ontario on March 23, 2016, after the Prime Minister had announced his intention to recommend his appointment on March 18, 2016. He served as Representative of the Government in the Senate from 2016 to 2019.

A longtime senior bureaucrat in the Canadian civil service, he was deputy minister to the Minister of Foreign Affairs when he retired from the civil service in 2007. He later became senior policy advisor for Denton's, a Canadian law firm, and had a key role on Justin Trudeau's transition team following the 2015 election. From 2009 to 2016, he served as the President of the Canada China Business Council, before his appointment as a senator. On November 29, 2019, the Prime Minister's office announced that Senator Harder would be stepping down from his position as Representative of the Government in the Senate effective December 31, 2019. Senator Grant Mitchell retired as Government Liaison in the Senate, when Harder's successor was named the following month.

On May 14, 2020, Harder joined the Progressive Senate Group. Explaining his move, Harder said he was concerned that partisanship in the Senate had been replaced by "majoritarianism" as the Independent Senators Group became the largest caucus, and wanted to be "part of a bulwark against that."

Awards

References

External links

Canadian civil servants
Canadian Mennonites
Canadian senators from Ontario
Independent Canadian senators
Members of the King's Privy Council for Canada
Living people
1952 births
21st-century Canadian politicians